Gert Tobias and Uwe Tobias (born 1973) are twin brothers working as a collaborative duo of visual artists.

The brothers were born in Braşov, Romania; they live and work in Cologne. They are known for their woodcut prints as well as relief sculptures, drawings using typewriters, watercolours and ceramics.  Their work centres on their Romanian heritage and the myth and legend that is associated with that area, such as the story of Dracula.  They combine their native history with elements of contemporary graphic design, camp horror films and abstract art.

An untitled installation shown at the Frieze Art Fair in 2007 paired shuffleboard motifs with the aesthetics of Russian Constructivism while suggesting as its subject several variations of a creation story. It consisted of preliminary drawings made using a typewriter threaded with black and red ribbon, collages, ceramic trophy figurines, and large color woodblock prints on paper. This installation was remounted by Team Gallery at their Wooster Street location in 2012.

Selected exhibitions
2004
Kunstverein e.V., Cologne  
2005
Dead / Undead, Galerie Six Friedrich Lisa Ungar, Munich  
7, Simon Lee Gallery, London
Roswitha meets Dionysos, The Breeder Projects, Athens  
2006
Loveless, Team Gallery, New York
Hammer Museum, Los Angeles
2007
If You Build It, They Will Come, Brukenthal Museum, Sibiu
Return to Form, Patricia Low Contemporary, Gstaad   
Projects 86, Museum of Modern Art, New York
Made in Germany - Aktuelle Kunst aus Deutschland, Sprengel Museum Hannover, Hannover   
2008
Kunstmuseum Bonn, Bonn

2010
Exhibiting with photographer Diane Arbus at Nottingham Contemporary from 17 July till 3 October 2010. {Link}

2011
Gemeentemuseum, The Hague, Netherlands
2012
Gert & Uwe Tobias, Kunstverein Hamburg, Hamburg, Germany
2013
Gert & Uwe Tobias, Whitechapel Gallery, London, UK

References

Bibliography
Rhoda Eitel-Porter, "Gert & Uwe Tobias". Print Quarterly, XXX, no. 3, September 2013, pp. 361–365.

External links
Gert and Uwe Tobias on ArtFacts.com
Gert and Uwe Tobias on ArtNet.com
Gert and Uwe Tobias at Artist Pension Trust
Further information from the Saatchi Gallery
More information from Galerie Rodolphe Janssen

Romanian artists
Romanian twins
German twins
German people of German-Romanian descent
1973 births
Living people
People from Brașov